Leor S. Weinberger is an American virologist and quantitative biologist.  He is credited with discovering the HIV virus latency circuit, which provided the first experimental evidence that stochastic fluctuations ('noise') in gene expression are used for cell fate decisions. He has also pioneered the concept of therapeutic interfering particles, or “TIPs”, which are resistance-proof antivirals. His TED talk on this novel antiviral approach 20 years in the making has been called a "highlight"  of TED and received a standing ovation from the live audience.

Weinberger is currently the William and Ute Bowes Distinguished Professor of Virology, director of the Gladstone Center for Cell Circuitry, professor of pharmaceutical chemistry, and professor of biochemistry and biophysics at Gladstone Institutes/University of California, San Francisco He is the only person to ever win the NIH Director’s Pioneer Award, NIH/NIDA Avant Garde Award, and NIH Director's New Innovator Award.

Education and career 
Weinberger received his undergraduate degree in biophysics from University of Maryland, College Park in 1998. He completed his PhD in Biophysics, with a focus on HIV, from University of California, Berkeley in 2004. He received postdoctoral training at Princeton University as a Lewis Thomas Fellow, working with Thomas Shenk and David Botstein.

After completing his fellowship at Princeton, Weinberger joined the University of California, San Diego, as an assistant professor for the Department of Chemistry and Biochemistry. Afterwards, he moved to the University of California, San Francisco (UCSF) in an associate professor in biochemistry and biophysics before transitioning to Gladstone Institutes, the non-profit research institution associated with UCSF. Weinberger is now the director of the Gladstone UCSF Center for Cell Circuitry and Bowes Distinguished Professor, and he retains his professorships at UCSF in pharmaceutical chemistry and biochemistry and biophysics.

Research

Areas of focus 
Weinberger and his lab specialize in virology, with a specific focus on HIV/AIDS, human cytomegalovirus, and herpesvirus. As stated on their website, the lab uses “mathematical & experimental approaches to decode the regulatory principles viruses use to select between alternate fates” and develop therapeutic targets and antiviral strategies based on those principles.

Major discoveries 
Weinberger and his lab have been credited with the discovery of HIV’s intrinsic decision circuit. Their 2005 paper in Cell showed that stochastic fluctuations in gene expression, or ‘noise’ can drive cell fate decisions enabling viral latency, which is recognized as a primary barrier to HIV cure.  The lab has since been able to identify similar stochastic processes in other viruses, such as a kind of herpesvirus called human cytomegalovirus, as published in a 2020 paper. Weinberger and his lab are looking for ways to target the latency reservoir of viruses as a form of treatment.

Weinberger's work has been referred to as "part of what some scientists are calling a 'renaissance' in viral therapy" by the San Francisco Chronicle.  According to Wired, Weinberger has pioneered research to combat HIV by creating "therapeutic interfering particles" or "TIPs". Weinberger first began testing this concept when he was in graduate school at Berkeley studying the biophysics of HIV. As described on Weinberger’s lab website and in a pre-print research article, TIPs are engineered deletion mutants designed to piggyback on a virus and deprive the virus of replication material, thus reducing viral load. TIPs replicate and co-evolve with a virus, making it a treatment that solves what Weinberger has called a “fundamental mismatch” between viruses and treatment: viruses evolve, vaccines do not. TIPs also have the capacity to transmit along viral transmission routes, harnessing the power of virus “super spreaders” and transmitting the treatment to resource-limited and remote populations like communities in South Africa. TIP research has been supported by the Department of Defense DARPA program, NIH/NIDA, and recently the Joint Warfighter Medical Research Program for a clinical trial.

Awards and honors 

Weinberger holds numerous patents for inventing novel antiviral medicines. Weinberger was named a Pew Scholar in the Biomedical Sciences in 2008, an Alfred P. Sloan Foundation Research Fellow in 2011, and a Keck Awardee. He served on the Bill & Melinda Gates Foundation Innovation review panel, and his research has been widely published in Science, Nature, and Cell. He is the only person to win the NIH Director’s Pioneer, Avant Garde, and New Innovator Awards.

References

Living people
American virologists
University of California, San Francisco faculty
1975 births